O... Çocukları is a 2008 Turkish drama film directed by Murat Saraçoğlu. It was the 8th most successful film at the Turkish box office in 2008.

Cast 
 Demet Akbağ - Mehtap Anne
 İpek Tuzcuoğlu - Hatice
 Özgü Namal - Dona
 Sarp Apak - Saffet
 Altan Erkekli - Lokman

References

External links 

2008 comedy films
2008 films
Turkish comedy films
2000s Turkish-language films